Walter C. Pfister (born July 8, 1961) is an American director and former cinematographer, who is best known for his work with filmmaker Christopher Nolan. Some of his collaborations with Nolan include Memento (2000), The Dark Knight Trilogy (2005–2012), and Inception (2010). For his work on Inception, Pfister won an Academy Award for Best Cinematography and received a BAFTA Award nomination.

Pfister is also known for his work on director F. Gary Gray's The Italian Job and Bennett Miller's Moneyball. In 2014, Pfister made his directorial debut with Transcendence (2014), through Alcon Entertainment. In addition to feature films, he has also directed commercials and television, including episodes of Flaked and The Tick.

Early life 
Pfister was born in Chicago, Illinois, and raised in the New York City suburb of Irvington-on-Hudson. He is the son of Patricia Ann (née Conway) and Walter J. Pfister, Jr. His grandfather was the city editor of a newspaper in Wisconsin. His father, also known as Wally, was a TV news producer, who began his career with CBS-TV in Chicago in 1955. Later, as an executive at ABC News, the elder Pfister worked with David Brinkley and Peter Jennings, covering political conventions, space flights and the civil rights movement.

When Pfister was about 11, a film company shot scenes for Shamus (1973), featuring Burt Reynolds, in his Irvington neighborhood. The boy was fascinated by the crew setting up lights and cameras. Soon afterwards, he began shooting 8 mm home movies and short films. Pfister also emulated his father by shooting slides on Kodachrome film and assembling them into shows for family and friends.

Career 
After high school, Pfister found a job as a production assistant at a television station, WMDT-TV, in Salisbury, Maryland. Within a couple of months, he borrowed a CP-16 news camera and began shooting films on weekends, including a visual essay about a Victorian house. "I did these slow, little intricate moves around the architecture of the house", he recalls, "cut it together with music, and showed it to the production manager. They made me a cameraman. I shot very low budget PSAs for $125 a week".

Within a few months, Pfister found a job as a cameraman for a Washington news service, which provided film for TV stations around the country. He covered the United States Congress, the White House and breaking news from 1982 through 1985. In 1985 Pfister began a freelance career shooting documentaries for the PBS series Frontline and industrial videos for various Washington production companies.

In 1988, Robert Altman came to Washington to direct a mini-series for HBO called Tanner '88 (1988). Altman was looking for a real news cameraman to play that role in his show. They hired Pfister and asked him to also shoot some B-roll. When the producers saw his work, they brought Pfister on the show as the second unit cameraman. It was the first time he was exposed to acting and dramatic material.

After that experience, Pfister enrolled at the American Film Institute. During his second year, he collaborated with his classmates on a short film called "Senzeni Na?", which was nominated for an Academy Award for Best Live Action Short Film in 1991. The film told the story of a man caught up in the apartheid struggle. Pfister drew on his documentary experience, and lit it darkly and stark, using a single light so the actor could play in and out of that source.

Janusz Kamiński had just graduated from the AFI Conservatory and met Pfister that year. He saw Pfister's film and recruited him as a grip and electrician for various projects, including a few with Phedon Papamichael.

Roger Corman gave Pfister an opportunity to shoot pickup shots and inserts for a Papamichael film. It was the first time he shot 35 mm film. After that, Pfister handled second unit for Papamichael on Body Chemistry and also on other Corman films.

Pfister shot The Unborn, his first feature, in 1991. After that, he filmed an array of independent B-movies, typically on 15-day schedules. Many of these early films were directed by Gregory Dark.

In 1995, Papamichael asked Pfister to operate for him on Diane Keaton's Unstrung Heroes (1995).

Work with Christopher Nolan 
In 1998, Pfister shot The Hi-Line in Montana in the dead of winter on a $300,000 budget. It got into the competition at Sundance Film Festival. There, he met Nolan, who had a film at Slamdance. Pfister's first collaboration with Nolan was on the neo-noir thriller Memento (2000). The success of this collaboration resulted in Pfister taking over as director of photography for Nolan's subsequent films: Insomnia (2002), Batman Begins (2005), The Prestige (2006), The Dark Knight (2008), which he partially shot with IMAX cameras, and Inception, which was shot partially in 5-perf 65 mm. He is the only cinematographer that has worked with director Christopher Nolan between Memento and The Dark Knight Rises, and has served as cinematographer for all of Nolan's films except for Following (1998), for which Nolan acted as cinematographer himself, Interstellar (2014), Dunkirk (2017), and Tenet (2020), in those of which he was replaced by Hoyte van Hoytema, after Pfister got the chance to direct his first film, Transcendence. Pfister has stated that he "turned down many projects (including several Harry Potter films), in some cases just to be available for Nolan, or to stay home with my family."

Pfister has been nominated for an Academy Award for Best Cinematography four times, each time for a film directed by Nolan. He won an Academy Award for his work on Inception at the 83rd Academy Awards. He also has been nominated three times for the American Society of Cinematographers Award for Outstanding Achievement in Cinematography in Theatrical Releases, for Batman Begins, The Dark Knight and Inception, winning for the latter, in 2011.

Directorial work 
Pfister made his directorial debut with the science fiction thriller Transcendence, starring Johnny Depp, which was released by Warner Bros. on April 18, 2014. The cast also featured Morgan Freeman, Kate Mara, Cillian Murphy, Rebecca Hall, and Paul Bettany.

Pfister had stated in 2015 he is finished with working as a cinematographer and planned to continue as a director.

Personal life 
Pfister currently resides in Los Angeles, California and has three children: Nick, actress Claire Julien, and Mia.

He is a member of the American Society of Cinematographers (ASC) since 2002, and the British Society of Cinematographers (BSC) since 2011.

Filmography

As cinematographer

As director 
Film
 Transcendence (2014)

Television

Other credits 
Additional photography

2nd unit director of photography

Visual consultant

Awards and nominations 
Academy Awards

BAFTA Awards

American Society of Cinematographers

Other awards

References

External links 
A Conversation with Wally Pfister

1961 births
Living people
American people of German descent
American cinematographers
AFI Conservatory alumni
Artists from Chicago
Best Cinematographer Academy Award winners
Film directors from New York City
Film directors from Illinois
Storm King School alumni